Pedro Manuel Mendes Ribeiro (born 25 January 1983 in Paredes, Porto District) is a Portuguese former professional footballer who played as a central defender.

References

External links

1983 births
Living people
People from Paredes, Portugal
Portuguese footballers
Association football defenders
Primeira Liga players
Liga Portugal 2 players
Segunda Divisão players
FC Porto B players
FC Porto players
F.C. Marco players
Gil Vicente F.C. players
C.D. Trofense players
C.F. Os Belenenses players
F.C. Penafiel players
Rebordosa A.C. players
Girabola players
C.R.D. Libolo players
Portugal youth international footballers
Portugal under-21 international footballers
Portuguese expatriate footballers
Expatriate footballers in Angola
Portuguese expatriate sportspeople in Angola
Sportspeople from Porto District